Andhra Pradesh Central Power Distribution Company Limited (APCPDCL) HQ: Vijayawada was formed on 05-12-2019 to cater the electricity needs of seven districts in Andhra Pradesh state, viz.
Distribution – Bifurcation of Andhra Pradesh Southern Power Distribution Company 
Limited, as Andhra Pradesh Southern Power Distribution Company Limited and 
Andhra Pradesh Central Power Distribution Company Limited. 

Guntur, Bapatla, Palnadu, Krishna, NTR, Prakasam districts. The APCPDCL is serving six districts  in Andhra Pradesh state.

The Chairman & Managing Director, APSPDCL, Tirupati shall take necessary 
action for creation of Andhra Pradesh Central Power Distribution Company Limited, 
Vijayawada

following the statutory provisions.

1. The division of posts shall be as follows: 

(a) Posts at or below district level: Based on location. 

(b) Posts at corporate headquarters office: 35% CPDCL : 65% SPDCL considering only the posts of erstwhile APSPDCL prior to state bifurcation.
 

2. The division of staff shall be done as follows:

(a) Staff where unit of recruitment is at or below district level: Based on location.

(b) District staff where unit of recruitment is company level: Cadre wise based on 
ratio of posts sanctioned between Krishna, Guntur & Prakasam on one hand 
and SPS Nellore, Chittoor and YSR Kadapa on the other hand.

(c) Staff where unit of recruitment is Corporate Headquarters office: ratio of 
posts sanctioned between Krishna, Guntur & Prakasam on one hand and SPS 
Nellore, Chittoor and YSR Kadapa on the other hand.

(d) For the purpose of division of staff Kurnool and Anantapur districts shall not 
be included.

(e) Options will be asked and allocation will be done based on induction 
seniority.

3.The immovable assets will be divided based on location.

4. Movable assets and liabilities will be divided based on 35% CPDCL : 65% 
SPDCL. For this purpose Kurnool and Anantapur will be excluded.

See also
Andhra Pradesh Eastern Power Distribution Company Limited
Andhra Pradesh Southern Power Distribution Company Limited
Andhra Pradesh Power Generation Corporation
Transmission Corporation of Andhra Pradesh

References

Electric power distribution network operators in India
Energy in Andhra Pradesh
State agencies of Andhra Pradesh
2019 establishments in Andhra Pradesh
Indian companies established in 2019
Energy companies established in 2019